The 2017–18 Hertha BSC season was the 126th season in the football club's history and 5th consecutive and 35th overall season in the top flight of German football, the Bundesliga, having been promoted from the 2. Bundesliga in 2013. In addition to the domestic league, Hertha BSC also participated in this season's editions of the domestic cup, the DFB-Pokal, and the second-tier continental cup, the UEFA Europa League. This was the 50th season for Hertha in the Olympiastadion Berlin, located in Berlin, Germany. The season covered a period from 1 July 2017 to 30 June 2018.

Players

Squad information

Competitions

Overview

Bundesliga

League table

Results summary

Results by round

Matches

DFB-Pokal

UEFA Europa League

Group stage

Statistics

Appearances and goals

|-
! colspan=14 style=background:#dcdcdc; text-align:center| Goalkeepers

|-
! colspan=14 style=background:#dcdcdc; text-align:center| Defenders

|-
! colspan=14 style=background:#dcdcdc; text-align:center| Midfielders

|-
! colspan=14 style=background:#dcdcdc; text-align:center| Forwards

|-
! colspan=14 style=background:#dcdcdc; text-align:center| Players transferred out during the season

References

Hertha BSC seasons
Berliner SC, Hertha
Hertha BSC